Damon Jones is an American economist and Associate Professor at the Harris School of Public Policy in the University of Chicago. Alongside his academic research, Jones is a popular science communicator and regularly provides expert commentary on issues related to economics and public policy. During the COVID-19 pandemic he investigated the disproportionate impact of coronavirus disease on communities of color, and delivered evidence on his findings before the United States House Committee on the Budget.

Early life and education 
As a high school student, Jones was selected as a Du Bois Scholar. He studied public policy at Stanford University, where he minored in African-American studies. He moved to the University of California, Berkeley for his graduate studies, where he specialized in economics and worked alongside Emmanuel Saez. After earning his doctoral degree, Jones returned to Stanford, joining the Stanford Institute for Economic Policy Research as a Searle Freedom Trust Postdoctoral Scholar. During this time he held an affiliate research position at the University of Wisconsin–Madison Center for Financial Stability.

Research and career 
After completing his postdoctoral fellowship in 2010, Jones joined the faculty at the Harris School of Public Policy.  He holds a Faculty Research Fellowship at the National Bureau of Economic Research. Jones specialises in three areas of economics; including public finance, government taxation and behavioural taxation.

Jones' early work considered income taxes and household finance in low-income households.  He called for a revamping of the earned income tax credit, learning from the Working Tax Credit scheme in the United Kingdom and delivering payments in a more timely manner. Jones has also investigated the employment decisions of older Americans, and evaluated the impact of the Social Security Annual Earnings Test (AET). The AET reduces the benefits of claimants in proportion to the amount of money they earn in excess of a certain amount. Jones previously served on the Chicago Resilient Families Task Force, which was funded by the Economic Security Project, which proposed cash transfer to low-income families. The program was based on Jones' research which had identified that cash transfers can immediately improve well being, and do not result in people leaving the workforce.

As a loyal fan of college sports, Jones became interested in the economics of student athletes, and has argued that they should be both paid and unionized. Jones has investigated the racial wealth gap in the United States, showing that not only do Black households have less wealth than their white counterparts, but they are more likely to be unemployed and less likely to access unemployment benefits.

Jones is part of the Innovations for Poverty Action research program that looks at ways to support teachers who were struggling with their finances. Teacher turnover is high in the United States, particularly in schools that serve low-income families, and it may be related to their extortionate student loan debt. Federal loan forgiveness programs may offer some respite, but they are not frequently used, and Jones wondered whether personalized interventions might help.

In 2020, Jones was awarded an National Institute for Health Care Management research award to investigate workplace wellness program. He is principal investigator of the Illinois Workplace Wellness Study, a randomized controlled trial that looks to evaluate the effects of financial incentives on employee participation in workplace wellness programs.

During the COVID-19 pandemic, Jones investigated why communities of color were the hardest hit. He showed that persistent racial inequality meant that shocks to income affected Black and hispanic households more strongly than white ones. In June 2020 Jones delivered evidence before the United States House Committee on the Budget where he explained that the COVID-19 pandemic in the United States would disproportionately impact those with low levels of financial stability. As part of the hearing Jones made the statement “while it may seem that the current crisis calls on all of us to make sacrifices, not all households have to tighten their belts equally,”.

In November 2020, Jones was named a volunteer member of the Joe Biden presidential transition Agency Review Team to support transition efforts related to the Council of Economic Advisers.

Jones has called for more diversity within economics, particularly increasing the representation of Black economists. He serves on the Board of Directors of the W. E. B. Du Bois Scholars Institute, which looks to support high school students from communities who have historically experienced barriers to opportunity.

Personal life 
Jones is married to Eve Ewing, an American poet, Sociologist and visual artist.

Select publications 

 
 
 
Jones, Damon. "Inertia and overwithholding: explaining the prevalence of income tax refunds." American Economic Journal: Economic Policy 4, no. 1 (2012): 158–85.

References 

21st-century African-American people
21st-century American economists
African-American economists
Living people
Stanford University alumni
UC Berkeley College of Letters and Science alumni
University of Chicago faculty
Year of birth missing (living people)